NASCAR Productions, LLC is an American production company headquartered in Charlotte, North Carolina, United States.  The company is a subsidiary of NASCAR and produces programs to promote the sport of professional stock car racing. The company can be considered an equivalent to the National Football League's NFL Films division. Prior to 2008, the company was known as NASCAR Images, but changed their name with the advent of digital television.

External links 
 Company website 

NASCAR mass media